China was the host of the 2008 Summer Paralympics, held in Beijing. China's delegation included 547 people, of whom 332 were competitors. The athletes, 197 men and 135 women, ranged in age from 15 to 51 and competed in all twenty sports. 226 of the competitors participated in the Paralympic Games for the first time. The delegation was the largest in Chinese history and at the 2008 Games. China topped the medal count at the 2004 Summer Paralympics in Athens. China dominated the medal count winning the most gold, silver, bronze, and total medals by a wide margin in Beijing.

During the games, some Chinese Paralympians broke 62 world and Paralympic records in athletics, swimming, powerlifting, shooting, cycling and archery. Strong Chinese contenders were Wang Xiaofu and Li Hanhua (swimming), Guo Wei (shot put and javelin), and Zhang Haidong (powerlifting). Olympic competitors will also include Li Duan in the men's long jump. Zhang Xiaoling, ten time gold medallist in table tennis was competing at the Paralympics for the sixth and last time. She won a bronze medal in the women's singles.

Rowing made its Paralympic debut in Beijing, and the Chinese team competed in eight other Paralympic sports for the first time: equestrian, wheelchair rugby, wheelchair basketball, sailing, boccia, goalball, football 5-a-side and football 7-a-side.

Medalists

| width="78%" align="left" valign="top" |

| width="22%" align="left" valign="top" |

Sports

Archery

Men

|-
|align=left|Cheng Changjie
|align=left|Men's individual recurve W1/W2
|626
|5
|W 104-88
|W 108-103
|W 99-93
|W 112-98
|W 108-104
|
|-
|align=left|Chen Yegang
|rowspan=3 align=left|Men's individual recurve standing
|628
|2
|Bye
|W 100-94
|W 98-95
|L 98=105
|W 98-93
|
|-
|align=left|Dong Zhi
|625
|3
|Bye
|W 108-102
|L 104-106
|colspan=3|did not advance
|-
|align=left|Zhu Weiliang
|591
|16
|L 95-95
|colspan=5|did not advance
|}

Women

|-
|align=left|Wang Li
|align=left|Women's individual compound
|551
|8
|colspan=2 
|L 81-107
|colspan=3|did not advance
|-
|align=left|Cao Xuerong
|rowspan=3 align=left|Women's individual recurve W1/W2
|554
|7
|Bye
|W 79-65
|L 81-99
|colspan=3|did not advance
|-
|align=left|Fu Hongzhi
|600
|2
|Bye
|W 97-75
|W 99-81
|W 82-76
|L 85-91
|
|-
|align=left|Xiao Yanhong
|611 WR
|1
|Bye
|W 91-66
|W 96-90
|L 93-95
|W 98-94
|
|-
|align=left|Gao Fangxia
|rowspan=3 align=left|Women's individual recurve standing
|593
|2
|Bye
|W 89-89
|W 106-83
|W 98-85
|L 92-103
|
|-
|align=left|Wang Yanhong
|495
|20
|L 82-89
|colspan=5|did not advance
|-
|align=left|Yan Huilian
|534
|16
|W 98-96
|L 97-101
|colspan=4|did not advance
|}

Teams

|-
|align=left|Chen Yegang Cheng Changjie Dong Zhi
|align=left|Men's team recurve
|1879
|3
|colspan=2 
|W 202-191
|W 208-201
|L 206-209
|
|-
|align=left|Fu Hongzhi Gao Fangxia Xiao Yanhong
|align=left|Women's team recurve
|1804 WR
|1
|colspan=2 
|W 187-165
|W 194-178
|W 205-177
|
|}

Athletics

Men's track

Men's field

Women's track

Women's field

Boccia

Individual events

Pairs/teams events

Cycling

Men's road

Men's track

Women's road

Women's track

Equestrian

Football 5-a-side

The men's football 5-a-side team won a silver medal in the football 5-a-side

Players
Chen Shanyong 
Li Xiaoqiang 
Wang Yafeng
Wang Zhoubin
Wei Zheng
Xia Zheng
Yang Xinqiang
Yu Yutan
Zhang Qiang
Zheng Wenfa

Tournament
Group stage

Gold medal match

Football 7-a-side

The men's football 7-a-side team didn't win any medals; they were 8th out of 8 teams.

Players
Dong Xinliang
Fan Zhichao
He Jinghua
Lang Yunlong
Li Chuan
Liu Bo
Wu Gang
Xu Guojun
Yang Wenshun
Yang Ye
Zhu Xu
Zhuge Bin

Tournament
Group stage

7th-8th place match

Goalball

Men's team
The men's goalball team won the gold medal after defeating Lithuania.

Players
Bao Daolei
Cai Changgui
Chen Liangliang
Du Jinran
Yang Chunhong
Yao Yongquan

Group B Matches

Quarterfinals

Semifinals

Gold medal match

Women's team
The women's team won a silver medal after being defeated by reigning champions United States in the gold medal match.

Players
Chen Fengqing
Fan Feifei
Lin Shan
Wang Ruixue
Wang Shasha
Xu Juan

Preliminary matches

Semifinals

Gold medal match

Judo

Men

Women

Powerlifting

Men

Women

Rowing

Sailing

Shooting

Men

Women

Swimming

Men

Women

Table tennis

Men's singles

Women's singles

Men's teams

Women's teams

Volleyball

The men's volleyball team didn't win any medals; they were 5th out of 8 teams. However, the women's team won the gold medal after defeating the United States.

Men's tournament
Players
Gao Hui
Ding Xiaochao
Dou Wencheng
Huang Chunji
Li Ji
Li Lei
Li Mingfa
Tong Jiao
Wang Haidong
Wang Xiaolang
Zhang Zhongmin
Zhou Canming

Group A matches

5-8 Semifinals

5th-6th place game

Women's tournament
Players
Li Liping
Liang Fen
Liu Lijuan
Lu Chunli
Lu Hongqin
Sheng Yuhong
Tan Yanhua
Yang Yanling
Zhang Lijun
Zhang Xufei
Zheng Xiongying
Zhong Haihong

Group B matches

Semifinals

Gold medal match

Wheelchair basketball

The men's basketball team didn't win any medals; they were 12th out of 12 teams.

Players
Guojun Chen
Hai Ding
Haijing Chen
Hang Xu
Huanjian Qu
Lei Yang
Lei Zhang
Pengcheng Li
Xunan Huang
Yandong Guo
Yinhai Lin

Men's tournament
Group B results

 

 

 

Classification 9-12

Eleventh place

The women's basketball team didn't win any medals; they were 7th out of 10 teams.

Players
Chao Yang
Damei Chen
Donghuai Zheng
Fengling Peng
Li Gu
Mihuan Liu
Qiuping Cao
Qiurong Chen
Santao Zhang
Wenhua Hao
Yanhua Li
Yongqing Fu

Women's tournament
Group B Matches

 

 

 

Quarterfinals

Classification 5-8

Seventh place

Wheelchair fencing

Men

Women

Wheelchair rugby

The men's rugby team didn't win any medals; they were 8th out of 8 teams.

Players
Chen Jun
Cheng Shuangmiao
Cui Maosheng
Han Guifei
Pan Zilin
Shao Dequan
Tao Zhenfang
Tian Shilin
Wang Sheng
Xia Junfeng
Yu Zhongtao
Zhang Wenli

Tournament

Wheelchair tennis

Men

Women

See also
China at the Paralympics
China at the 2008 Summer Olympics
Sports in China

References

External links
Beijing 2008 Press Release - IPC
Beijing 2008 Paralympic Games Official Site
International Paralympic Committee
National Paralympic Committee of China (NPCC) - short introduction

Nations at the 2008 Summer Paralympics
2008
2008 in Chinese sport